The Ribe healing stick (with Rundata signum DR EM85;493, also known as DK SJy41) is a pinewood stick found at Ribe, Denmark, with a heavily pagan-inspired Christian spell. It dates to circa 1300 CE.

Description

Although ostensibly Christian, the charm written on the stick contains several native Germanic elements, such as alliteration and phrases also known from pagan poetry.

The phrase 'nine needs' (ni : no=uþær) appears in several explicitly pagan charms, such as the Swedish Sigtuna plate 1 and the Icelandic spell-book Galdrabók. It is too found in the pagan Icelandic poem Sigrdrífumál, while the phrase "heavens above" or "high heaven" (uphimæn, literally "up-heaven") is used in Vǫluspá and in Old Saxon and Old English religious poetry as well as in the inscription on the Skarpåker Stone. which also contains the term læknæshand ("healing hand").

Inscription
The stick has five sides. The final part of line C (after ¶r) has been scraped off with a knife, but faint traces of the runes are still visible. The following readings are from the Scandinavian Runic-text Database. Note that because the fifth side only contains the words þæt : se, it has been included in line D.

Runic transliteration
 §A ᛭ io=rþ : biþ a=k : ua=rþæ : o=k : uphimæn : so=l : o=k : sa=nt=æ maria : o=k : salfæn : gud| |drotæn : þæt han : læ mik : læknæs:ha=nd : o=k lif:tuggæ : at= =liuæ
 §B uiuindnæ : þær : botæ : þa=rf : or : ba=k : o=k or brʀst : or lækæ : o=k or lim : or øuæn : o=k or øræn : or : a=llæ þe : þær : ilt : kan i at 
 §C kumæ : suart : hetær : sten : ha=n : stær : i : hafæ : utæ : þær : ligær : a : þe : ni : no=uþær : þæ¶r : l---r(a) : (þ)en-nþþæþeskulhuærki 
 §D skulæ : huærki : søtæn : sofæ : æþ : uarmnæn : uakæ : førr æn : þu : þæssa : bot : biþær : þær : a=k o=rþ : at kæþæ : ro=nti : amæn : o=k : þæt : se ᛭

Old Danish normalisation
 §A Iorþ biþ ak uarþæ ok uphimæn, sol ok santæ Maria ok sialfæn Guþ drottin, þæt han læ mik læknæshand ok lif-tungæ at liuæ
 §B biuianda ær bota þarf or bak ok or bryst, or likæ ok or lim, or øwæn ok or øræn, or allæ þe þær ilt kan i at
 §C kumæ. Svart hetær sten, han stær i hafæ utæ þær ligær a þe ni nouþær, þær … …
 §D skulæ huærki søtæn sofæ æþ uarmæn uakæ førr æn þu þæssæ bot biþær, þær ak orþ at kæþæ ronti. Amen ok þæt se.

English translation
 §A I pray Earth to guard and High Heaven, the sun and Saint Mary and Lord God himself, that he grant me medicinal hands and healing tongue to heal
 §B the Trembler when a cure is needed. From back and from breast, from body and from limb, from eyes and from ears, from wherever evil can
 §C enter. A stone is called Svartr (black), it stands out in the sea, there lie upon it nine needs, who …
 §D shall neither sleep sweetly nor wake warmly until you pray this cure which I have proclaimed in runic words. Amen and so be it.

Gallery

See also
 Against a dwarf
 The 500-years older Ribe skull fragment.

References

Germanic paganism
Sources on Germanic paganism
Runic inscriptions
Historical runic magic
Archaeological discoveries in Denmark